Koichi Kawaguchi (12 March 1913 – 2004) was a Japanese equestrian. He competed in the individual jumping event at the 1956 Summer Olympics.

References

External links
 

1913 births
2004 deaths
Date of death missing
Japanese male equestrians
Olympic equestrians of Japan
Equestrians at the 1956 Summer Olympics